Willy Chang Wilkinson is an American writer, public health consultant, LGBTQ activist, and longterm LGBTQ cultural competency trainer from California.

As an expert in transgender issues, he has worked extensively with health care organizations, educational institutions, businesses and other entities on increasing access for LGBTQ populations.

Early life and education
Wilkinson was born in San Mateo, California in the early 1960s. He was assigned female at birth and is the youngest of four children. His father is of Scottish, English, and Irish descent. His mother is Chinese from Hawaii.

When Willy was nine years old, he changed his name to Willy. He earned a Bachelor of Arts degree (BA) in Women's Studies at University of California, Santa Cruz. He earned his Masters in Public Health (MPH) in Community Health Education from University of California, Berkeley.

Honors and awards
 2004: National Lesbian and Gay Journalists Association Excellence in Writing Award for his article in the San Francisco Chronicle about the social and political intersections of his parents' interracial marriage and his own same-sex marriage.
 2014: Transgender Law Center Claire Skiffington Vanguard Award (2014)
 2015: Keynote Speaker at UC Berkeley's Queer and Asian Conference 
 2015: Asian Pacific Islander Queer Women and Trans Community (APIQWTC), Phoenix Award
 2016: Lambda Literary Award, transgender non-fiction, for his book Born on the Edge of Race and Gender: A Voice for Cultural Competency

Published work
 Wilkinson, W. (2006). Public health gains of the transgender community in San Francisco: Grassroots organizing and community-based research. In P. Currah, R. Juang, & S. Minter (Eds.), Transgender rights (pp. 192–214), Minneapolis: University of Minnesota Press. [Lambda Literary Award Finalist]
 Wilkinson, W. (2015). Born on the Edge of Race and Gender: A Voice for Cultural Competency.  Winner of the Lambda Literary Award in transgender non-fiction, the book highlights his intersectional experiences of race, gender, sexuality, disability, class, and parenthood with reflections from the fields of cultural competency, public health, and political advocacy. Elucidates trans experience from a Chinese American and mixed heritage perspective, and uses the memoir genre as a cultural competency tool.
 Global perspective on transgender cultural competency in the inaugural edition of Transgender Studies Quarterly, 
 Trans Bodies, Trans Selves (2014) explores the intersections between mixed heritage and trans experience
 Manning Up: Transsexual Men on Finding Brotherhood, Family and Themselves addresses racism, Asian female subjugation, and transgender expression, and was described as "highly evocative" by the Lambda Literary Review.

Personal life
Wilkinson lives in Oakland, California with his three children.

References

1960s births
American people of Chinese descent
American people of English descent
American people of Irish descent
American people of Scottish descent
UC Berkeley School of Public Health alumni
University of California, Santa Cruz alumni
LGBT people from California
People from San Mateo, California
Transgender rights activists
Living people
Lambda Literary Award winners
American LGBT people of Asian descent
Transgender memoirists
Date of birth missing (living people)
American transgender writers